James Durrant may refer to:

 James Durrant (photochemist), professor of photochemistry at Imperial College London
 James Durrant (Australian Army officer) (1885–1963), Australian army general